Real Club Celta de Vigo, S.A.D. "B" is a Spanish football team based in Vigo, Pontevedra, in the autonomous community of Galicia. Founded in 1927, it is the reserve team of Celta Vigo and competes in the Primera Federación – Group 1. They play their home games at Municipal de Barreiro, with a 1,024-seat capacity.

History
In 1927 the Sport Club Turista was founded, being renamed the Club Turista nine years later. In 1988 a merge was predicted with Gran Peña FC, but finally the Turista was absorbed by Celta de Vigo, being named the Celta Turista.

In its first season of professional football, Celta Turista played in the Preferente Autonómica, finishing in first place with 57 points. It first reached the third division in 1992–93, being relegated the following campaign; in 1996, in order to comply with the new Royal Spanish Football Federation regulations, the club changed its denomination to the Celta de Vigo B. In the 1996–97 season the club finished in 19th place in Segunda División B and relegated back to the fourth division. 

In the 2018–19 season Celta B was close to relegation, but saved its place in Segunda División B. The club finished 16th among 20 teams.

Club background
Sport Club Turista (1927–1936)
Club Turista (1936–1988)
Celta Turista (1988–1996)
Celta de Vigo B (1996–present)

Current squad
.

Reserve team

Out on loan

Season-by-season record
As an independent club

As a reserve team of Celta de Vigo

2 seasons in Primera Federación
22 seasons in Segunda División B
38 seasons in Tercera División
18 seasons in Galician regional divisions

Honours
Tercera División: 1957–58, 1999–2000, 2000–01
Copa Federación de España: 2001–02

References

External links
Celta de Vigo official website
Futbolme team profile 
 

RC Celta de Vigo
Spanish reserve football teams
Football clubs in Galicia (Spain)
Association football clubs established in 1927
1927 establishments in Spain
Primera Federación clubs
Sport in Vigo